List of Hungarian exonyms for places in Ukraine.

Uzhhorod Raion

Ukraine
Hungarian exonyms in Ukraine
Hungarian
Hungarian